Battle of Greed is a 1937 American Western film directed by Howard Higgin and starring Tom Keene, Gwynne Shipman and James Bush. A silver strike in Virginia City leads to cutthroat completion to exploit the discovery.

The film's sets were designed by the art director Edward C. Jewell.

Partial cast
 Tom Keene as John Storm  
 Gwynne Shipman as Linda Avery  
 James Bush as Mark Twain
 Jimmy Butler as Danny Storm  
 Robert Fiske as Hammond  
 Carl Stockdale as Sawyer  
 Ray Bennett as Henchman Bates 
 William Worthington as Judge William H. Avery  
 Henry Roquemore as Judge Albion  
 Foxy Callahan as Jockey Brown 
 Lloyd Ingraham as Virginny  
 Budd Buster as Comstock

References

Bibliography
 Pitts, Michael R. Western Movies: A Guide to 5,105 Feature Films. McFarland, 2012.

External links
 

1937 films
1937 Western (genre) films
American Western (genre) films
Greed
Films set in Nevada
American black-and-white films
Cultural depictions of Mark Twain
1930s English-language films
1930s American films